Stevan Filipović (born 1981) is a Serbian film editor, director and lecturer. Best known for his box-office successes, such as Šejtanov ratnik (2006), Skinning (2010) and Next to Me (2015), he is recognized for depicting social commentary through elements of fantasy. In addition to his creative work, Filipović also served as an assistant lecturer to the class of actress Mirjana Karanović at the University of Arts in Belgrade  between 2012 and 2014. Subsequently, he started teaching fundamentals of visual effects and digital postproduction at the University.

He has received numerous national accolades as well as regional ones, including a grand prix at the Pula Film Festival.

In December 2021, Filipovic publicly came out as a member of the LGBT community, making him one of the first men in Serbia to do so.

Selected filmography
 Šejtanov ratnik (2006)
 Skinning (2010)
 Urgentni centar (2014-15); 3 episodes
 Next to Me (2015)
 A Good Wife (2016)
 Next To Me The Musical
 Breaking Point: A Star Wars Story'' (2019)

Selected accolades

Recent activity
In 2017, Stevan Filipović has signed the Declaration on the Common Language of the Croats, Serbs, Bosniaks and Montenegrins.

References

External links 

1981 births
Living people
Serbian film directors
Serbian film editors
Signatories of the Declaration on the Common Language
LGBT film directors
Serbian LGBT people